Eucalyptus mcquoidii, commonly known as the Quoin Head marlock, is a species of marlock, mallee or small tree that is endemic to a restricted area in Western Australia. It has smooth, greyish bark, glossy green, linear to narrow oblong adult leaves, flower buds in clusters of up to fifty that are fused at their bases, greenish flowers and fruit in spherical masses.

Description
It has smooth pale grey and whitish bark. Flowering has been recorded in April, October and November and the flowers are greenish yellow. The fruit form a spherical mass, each fruit  with three valves that remain joined at the tip.

Taxonomy and naming
Eucalyptus mcquoidii was first formally described in 2002 by Ian Brooker and Stephen Hopper from a specimen collected by Brooker near Quoin Head in the Fitzgerald River National Park. The description was published in the journal Nuytsia. The specific epithet (mcquoidii) honours Nathan McQuoid, former Fitzgerald River National Park head ranger, for his assistance to the authors.

Eucalyptus mcquoidii belongs in Eucalyptus subgenus Symphyomyrtus, section Bisectae, subsection Hadrotes because of its coarsely bisected cotyledons, erect stamens and larger, thick-rimmed fruits. The subsection Hadrotes contains ten species of which eight do not have oil glands in the branchlet pith. Together these eight species form series Lehmannianae, a group that has fruit with exserted valves that have fused tips even after the seeds are lost, a feature also shared with the distantly related Eucalyptus cornuta.

Of the eight species in series Lehmannianae, four species (E. mcquoidii, E. conferruminata, E. lehmannii and E. arborella) have the buds in each axillary cluster, fused basally.

Distribution and habitat
The Quoin Head marlock is found on coastal slopes, creeklines and cliff tops where it is only known from a small area at the type location near Quoin Head .

Conservation status
This eucalypt is classified as "Priority Two" by the Western Australian Government Department of Parks and Wildlife meaning that it is poorly known and from only one or a few locations.

See also
List of Eucalyptus species

References

mcquoidii
Endemic flora of Western Australia
Myrtales of Australia
Eucalypts of Western Australia
Plants described in 2002
Taxa named by Ian Brooker
Taxa named by Stephen Hopper